Brand New Day or A Brand New Day may refer to:

Music
Brand New Day, the American title for the 1990 Australian musical Bran Nue Dae

Albums
Brand New Day (Swollen Members album), 2014
Brand New Day (Ricki-Lee Coulter album), or the title song
Brand New Day (Sting album), or the title song, 1999
Brand New Day (The Watchmen album)
Brand New Day (Blood, Sweat & Tears album)
Brand New Day (The Mavericks)
A Brand New Day (album), by Vanessa Bell Armstrong
A Brand New Day, by Lime
A Brand New Day, by Frankie Laine, or the title song

Songs
"Brand New Day" (Massari song), 2012
"Brand New Day" (Sting song)
"Brand New Day" (Van Morrison song), 1970
"Brand New Day" (Kodaline song), 2013
"A Brand New Day" (The Wiz song), from the musical The Wiz
"A Brand New Day" (BTS and Zara Larsson song)
"Brand New Day", by 10cc from The Original Soundtrack
"Brand New Day", by Aice5
"Brand New Day" by Alex Lloyd, 2006
"Brand New Day", by Babymetal from Metal Galaxy
"Brand New Day", by Bryan Adams from Get Up
"Brand New Day", by Demi Lovato from  The Final Jam
"Brand New Day", by Dizzee Rascal from Boy in da Corner
"Brand New Day", by Eurythmics from Savage
"Brand New Day", by Fireflight from Unbreakable
"Brand New Day", by Forty Foot Echo from Forty Foot Echo
"Brand New Day", by Joshua Radin from Simple Times
"Brand New Day", by Miguel Migs from Colorful You
"Brand New Day", by No Doubt from No Doubt
"Brand New Day", by Ryan Star from the television show Lie to Me
"Brand New Day", by Scoopers from Sakura Gakuin 2010 Nendo: Message
"Brand New Day", from the film Dr. Horrible's Sing-Along Blog
"A Brand New Day", from the video game The Jungle Book Groove Party

Other media
Brand New Day, the American title for the 2009 Australian musical film Bran Nue Dae
Spider-Man: Brand New Day, a 2008 comic book storyline
Love Happens (working title: Brand New Day), a 2009 film starring Jennifer Aniston and Aaron Eckhart
 Brand New Day (Agents of S.H.I.E.L.D.)